Zebedee (zibhdi, "the gift of God"; cf. Zebadiah) was the Biblical father of James and John.

Zebedee may also refer to:

People
 Zebedee Armstrong (October 11, 1911 – 1993), an American outsider artist
 Zebedee E. Cliff (born 1864), an American architect, builder, and politician
 Zebedee Coltrin (7 September 1804 – 21 July 1887), a Mormon pioneer
 Zebedee Jones (b. March 12, 1970), an English painter
 Zebedee Soanes (b. 1976), a continuity announcer on BBC Radio 4

Popular culture
 Zebedee, a character in the BBC children's programme The Magic Roundabout
 Zebedee Tring, a past character in the BBC radio series The Archers
 a character from the children's television series TUGS, see List of Tugs characters#Zebedee
 New Zebedee, a fictional town which appears in children's works by John Bellairs and Brad Strickland

See also
 Zeberdee, a character in the movie The Football Factory